Michaël "Michel" Antonius Bernardus van de Korput (born 18 September 1956 in Wagenberg) is a retired Dutch footballer.

He also earned 23 caps for the Netherlands national football team from 1979 to 1985, and participated in UEFA Euro 1980.

References

External links
 
 

1956 births
Living people
Dutch footballers
Netherlands international footballers
UEFA Euro 1980 players
Feyenoord players
Van de Korput, Michel
1. FC Köln players
Van de Korput, Michel
Van de Korput, Michel
Eredivisie players
Bundesliga players
Dutch expatriate footballers
Van de Korput, Michel
Van de Korput, Michel
Expatriate footballers in Germany
Dutch expatriate sportspeople in Belgium
Dutch expatriate sportspeople in Germany
Dutch expatriate sportspeople in Italy
People from Drimmelen
Royal Cappellen F.C. players
Association football defenders
Footballers from North Brabant